The Cuno cabinet (German: Kabinett Cuno) was the seventh democratically elected Reichsregierung of the German Reich, during the period in which it is now usually referred to as the Weimar Republic. The cabinet was named after Reichskanzler (chancellor) Wilhelm Cuno and took office on 22 November 1922 when it replaced the Second Wirth cabinet under Joseph Wirth. The Cuno cabinet was forced to resign on 12 August 1923 and was replaced the next day by the first cabinet of Gustav Stresemann.

Establishment
Joseph Wirth's second cabinet resigned on 14 November 1922. The president, Social Democrat Friedrich Ebert asked Wilhelm Cuno on 16 November to form a new government. Cuno tried to put together a broad coalition of parties stretching from the newly re-unified Social Democratic Party of Germany (SPD) to the German People's Party (DVP). However, a majority of the SPD's Reichstag delegation opposed Ebert and refused to agree to a coalition including the DVP. Cuno's attempts to convince other business leaders to join his cabinet also mostly failed. After prolonged negotiations Cuno was appointed Reichskanzler on 22 November 1922, by presidential decree and without a vote in the Reichstag. He was the first chancellor in the Weimar Republic who was not a member of a party and a professional politician. Politically, he was quite far from president Ebert. Cuno formed a government partly composed of non-party economists - Wilhelm Groener, Heinrich Albert, Frederic von Rosenberg and - a few days later - Hans Luther. The balance of the cabinet was made up of members of the German People's Party (2 ministers), the German Democratic Party (2 ministers), the German Center Party (3  ministers) and the Bavarian People's Party (one). The government was referred to, alternatively as a Geschäftsministerium, Regierung der Wirtschaft  or Kabinett der Persönlichkeiten (cabinet of personages), emphasizing that it was not the result of an explicit coalition between the parliamentary parties. There was no written coalition agreement, but the parties mentioned provided the cabinet's core support in the Reichstag. Nevertheless, it was dependent on toleration from either the SPD or the DNVP. Initially, both of these parties were neutral or slightly supportive, but Cuno was still not able to put his cabinet to an outright vote of confidence. Instead, as a compromise, the Reichstag "took notice" of the government declaration and Cuno's reference to the last policy statement of Wirth's cabinet as the basis of his own platform. Only the Communists voted against him. This made the Cuno government the first Weimar government endorsed, if weakly, by the nationalists of the DNVP.

Overview of the members
The members of the cabinet were as follows:

Notes: Karl Müller resigned after just three days in office and was replaced on 25 November by Hans Luther. The Treasury was merged with the Ministry of Finance on 1 April 1923. The Ministry for Reconstruction was led by Staatssekretär Müller as acting minister until Albert took over as minister in late March.

Ruhrkampf and hyperinflation
The closeness between Cuno and the political right was a handicap for his cooperation with the SPD, the strongest party in the Reichstag. Yet these domestic issues that threatened to severely limit the cabinet's lifespan were quickly rendered secondary by foreign policy events as the Occupation of the Ruhr brought on a national emergency.

Dealing with the pressing matter of war reparations had been a priority for the Cuno government from the day it took office, as it had earlier been for the Wirth government. The new government continued to follow the policies of its predecessor on this issue. The goal was to convince the Allies to accept an extended payment moratorium for three to four years that would allow the Germans to stabilize their economy and currency first before resuming transfers. However, the French had budget problems of their own and refused to compromise on this, holding the German side to earlier agreements. The French government of prime minister/foreign minister Raymond Poincaré was convinced that Germany (and its industry) was unwilling rather than unable to make the reparations. A debt moratorium was considered possible only if France would be able to obtain "productive collateral" (such as direct Allied control over the coal mines of the Ruhr). On 26 December 1922, the reparations commission formally found that Germany had culpably failed to comply with its obligations concerning the delivery of wood, against the vote of the British commissioner. Similarly, it found on 9 January 1923 that the 1922 deliveries of coal to France had been deficient. Two days later French and Belgian troops occupied the Ruhr.

This caused outrage among the German public, media and political circles. All reparations to France and Belgium were stopped. A policy of "passive resistance" against all orders issued by the occupying authorities was announced. The mines were told not to make any more deliveries to these states, civil servants and Reichsbahn personnel were told to disobey orders by the occupation authorities. The Ruhr economy, the industrial heartland of Germany, came almost to a complete stop.

The Reich government thus had to pay for the upkeep of the families of those expelled or arrested by the occupation forces and support the rising number of people who became unemployed as a result of the industrial disruptions of the Ruhrkampf. Meanwhile, economic activity and tax revenues were negatively affected by the negative economic fallout of the Ruhr occupation and strikes. These costs of "passive resistance" were not paid for by raising taxes or through long-term borrowing in the credit markets but by printing money. As a result, inflation spiked and the Mark went into free fall on the currency markets. Concerns rose that the supply of imported food would dry up due to a lack of foreign currency that was draining away fast due to the Reichsbank's ultimately futile attempts to stabilize the Mark.

Attempts by the government to end the occupation and to resume talks about reparations in May and June 1923 failed as Poincaré refused to negotiate unless passive resistance was ended first. The hard stance taken by the French yielded the German side some international sympathy and the French were soon becoming isolated on this issue - on 11 August, the British government sent a harshly critical memorandum to the French which explicitly endorsed the German position that the Ruhr occupation was illegal. However, by that time popular discontent inside Germany against the government and in particular against the spiralling rate of inflation was rising fast. A wave of strikes against the government began in August 1923.

Resignation
Also on 11 August, the Social Democrats consequently brought a motion of no confidence against the government and announced their willingness to cooperate in a possible future "Grand Coalition". Before the motion could be brought to a vote in the Reichstag, Cuno and his cabinet resigned. A day later, Gustav Stresemann became Chancellor and formed his first cabinet.

References

Historic German cabinets
1922 establishments in Germany
Cabinets established in 1922
Cabinets disestablished in 1923